Klonowo  is a village in the administrative district of Gmina Lidzbark, within Działdowo County, Warmian-Masurian Voivodeship, in northern Poland.

The village has an approximate population of 270.

References

Villages in Działdowo County